"I Wish I Was Crazy Again" is a song written by Bob McDill and introduced by the duet of Johnny Cash and Waylon Jennings on Cash's 1978 album I Would Like to See You Again.

Two Cash and Jennings' duets from that album, "There Ain't No Good Chain Gang" and "I Wish I Was Crazy Again", were coupled together for a single release. "There Ain't No Good Chain Gang" peaked at number 2 on U.S. Billboard country chart for two weeks in July of that year, while "Wish I Was Crazy Again" peaked at number 22 a year and a half later, for two weeks of January 1980.

Track listing

Charts

References

External links 
 "I Wish I Was Crazy Again" on the Johnny Cash official website

1978 songs
Johnny Cash songs
Waylon Jennings songs
1978 singles
Songs written by Bob McDill
Columbia Records singles
American country music songs